

Events calendar

+07